Khwaja Hafizullah Kashmiri (1868–1884), also known as Moulavi Hafizullah, was an 18th-century merchant of Kashmiri origin. He and his nephew, Khwaja Alimullah, were the founding members of the Dhaka Nawab Estate, the largest zamindari held by any landholder in Eastern Bengal during the British colonial period.

Hafizullah collaborated with the Greek and Armenian merchants in Dhaka and developed a business in hides, skins, salt and spices. Under the act of the Permanent Settlement of Bengal, he bought some lots for the estate. In 1806, he acquired his first lot in the Atia pargana in the then Mymensingh district for a 4-anna share of a mortgage bond for Rs. 40,000. In 1812, he bought Aila Phuljhuri in the Sundarbans of about 44,000 acres for Rs. 21,000 at a revenue demand of Rs. 372 per year.

Death and legacy
Hafizullah had three wives including Dhan Bibi. On his death, his estate was inherited by his nephew Khwaja Alimullah, a son of his elder brother Ahsanullah.

References

1735 births
1815 deaths
People of Kashmir region
Nawabs of Dhaka
18th-century Indian businesspeople
19th-century Indian businesspeople
Place of birth unknown
Date of birth unknown
Place of death unknown
Date of death unknown